Sovetskoye Highway is a street in Novosibirsk and its suburbs. It connects the Kirovsky and Sovetsky districts of the city, Krasnoobsk and some other settlements. Its length is 9.5 km (5.9 mi).

The highway starts from Zatulinsky Microdistrict, runs through Novosibirsky District and ends at the intersection of Primorskaya, Chasovaya and Ivlev streets of ObGES Microdistrict.

History
From 2008 to 2015, the highway was reconstructed.

Gallery

See also
 Berdskoye Highway

References

Streets in Novosibirsk
Kirovsky District, Novosibirsk
Sovetsky District, Novosibirsk